ANCA or Anca may refer to:

 Anca (name), Romanian female first name
 Áncá language
 Ançã (Cantanhede), civil parish in Portugal
 Ançã, town in Portugal

Organization
 Australian Nature Conservation Agency, now Environment Australia
 Antarctic Names Committee of Australia
 Armenian National Committee of America

Business 

 ANCA (company), Australian manufacturing company

Science 

 Anti-neutrophil cytoplasmic antibody, proteins detected in a number of autoimmune disorders
 C-ANCA, a type of autoantibody

See also
 Anka (disambiguation)